Fonsi may refer to:

Luis Fonsi (born 1978), Puerto Rican singer
Fonsi Nieto (born 1978), Spanish motorcycle racer
Fonsi (footballer) (born 1986), Spanish footballer
 FONSI (finding of no significant impact)

See also

 
 Fonzie
 Fonzi (disambiguation)
 Fonzy
 Fozzie
 Fozzy (disambiguation)